Wassonite is an extremely rare titanium sulfide mineral with chemical formula TiS.  Its discovery was announced in a 2011 NASA press release as a single small grain within an enstatite chondrite meteorite called "Yamato 691", which was found during a 1969 Japanese expedition to Antarctica.  This grain represents the first observation in nature of the synthetic compound titanium(II) sulfide.

The mineral was named after John T. Wasson, a professor at the University of California, Los Angeles and was approved by the International Mineralogical Association.

References 

Sulfide minerals
Titanium minerals
Trigonal minerals
Minerals in space group 166